Som Saran (Khmer: សោមសារ៉ន) is a former footballer and manager from Cambodia.  
From 2005 onwards, he is the deputy director of the Veterans' Pensions Department at the Ministry of Social Affairs.

Early life

Raised in the town of Kampong Cham, he started football at age 16 and moved to the capital Phnom Penh.

Footballer career

After the Khmer Rouge took power, he was forced to flee to Vietnam where he played professionally until 1980 as the population was allowed to play sports. Some of his teammates were forced into agricultural work.  

He was a Cambodia International.
 
Saran captained the Cambodia national team in 1972, leading them to a fourth-place finish in the 1972 AFC Asian Cup. 
 
He was with the national team when it reconvened in 1980, lining up for them until 1994. When he returned, only six players were alive from the team that last played before the Khmer Rouge came.

Coaching career

While managing Cambodia, he insinuated that his players were involved in corruption. An investigation was conducted but the Cambodia Football Federation denied the accusation. 
In charge of Cambodia until 2005, he led his team to the 2004 Tiger Cup and played against Vietnam. His team mostly composed of 20 to 21 year old players.

References
 
 

Cambodia international footballers
Cambodian footballers
Association football midfielders
Cambodia national football team managers
People from Kampong Cham province
Expatriate footballers in Vietnam
Year of birth missing
Cambodian football managers